In set theory, Cantor's diagonal argument, also called the diagonalisation argument, the diagonal slash argument, the anti-diagonal argument, the diagonal method, and Cantor's diagonalization proof, was published in 1891 by Georg Cantor as a mathematical proof that there are infinite sets which cannot be put into one-to-one correspondence with the infinite set of natural numbers. Such sets are now known as uncountable sets, and the size of infinite sets is now treated by the theory of cardinal numbers which Cantor began.

The diagonal argument was not Cantor's first proof of the uncountability of the real numbers, which appeared in 1874.
However, it demonstrates a general technique that has since been used in a wide range of proofs, including the first of Gödel's incompleteness theorems and Turing's answer to the Entscheidungsproblem.  Diagonalization arguments are often also the source of contradictions like Russell's paradox and Richard's paradox.

Uncountable set 
Cantor considered the set T of all infinite sequences of binary digits (i.e. each digit is zero or one).
He begins with a constructive proof of the following lemma:
If s1, s2, ... , sn, ... is any enumeration of elements from T, then an element s of T can be constructed that doesn't correspond to any sn in the enumeration.
The proof starts with an enumeration of elements from T, for example
{|
|-
| s1 = || (0, || 0, || 0, || 0, || 0, || 0, || 0, || ...)
|-
| s2 = || (1, || 1, || 1, || 1, || 1, || 1, || 1, || ...)
|-
| s3 = || (0, || 1, || 0, || 1, || 0, || 1, || 0, || ...)
|-
| s4 = || (1, || 0, || 1, || 0, || 1, || 0, || 1, || ...)
|-
| s5 = || (1, || 1, || 0, || 1, || 0, || 1, || 1, || ...)
|-
| s6 = || (0, || 0, || 1, || 1, || 0, || 1, || 1, || ...)
|-
| s7 = || (1, || 0, || 0, || 0, || 1, || 0, || 0, || ...)
|-
| ...
|}
Next, a sequence s is constructed by choosing the 1st digit as complementary to the 1st digit of s1 (swapping 0s for 1s and vice versa), the 2nd digit as complementary to the 2nd digit of s2, the 3rd digit as complementary to the 3rd digit of s3, and generally for every n, the nth digit as complementary to the nth digit of sn. For the example above, this yields
{|
|-
| s1 || = || (0, || 0, || 0, || 0, || 0, || 0, || 0, || ...)
|-
| s2 || = || (1, || 1, || 1, || 1, || 1, || 1, || 1, || ...)
|-
| s3 || = || (0, || 1, || 0, || 1, || 0, || 1, || 0, || ...)
|-
| s4 || = || (1, || 0, || 1, || 0, || 1, || 0, || 1, || ...)
|-
| s5 || = || (1, || 1, || 0, || 1, || 0, || 1, || 1, || ...)
|-
| s6 || = || (0, || 0, || 1, || 1, || 0, || 1, || 1, || ...)
|-
| s7 || = || (1, || 0, || 0, || 0, || 1, || 0, || 0, || ...)
|-
| ...
|-
|
|-
| s || = || (1, || 0, || 1, || 1, || 1, || 0, || 1, || ...)
|}
By construction, s is a member of T that differs from each sn, since their nth digits differ (highlighted in the example).
Hence, s cannot occur in the enumeration.

Based on this lemma, Cantor then uses a proof by contradiction to show that:
The set T is uncountable.
The proof starts by assuming that T is countable.
Then all its elements can be written in an enumeration s1, s2, ... , sn, ... .
Applying the previous lemma to this enumeration produces a sequence s that is a member of T, but is not in the enumeration. However, if T is enumerated, then every member of T, including this s, is in the enumeration. This contradiction implies that the original assumption is false. Therefore, T is uncountable.

Real numbers 
The uncountability of the real numbers was already established by Cantor's first uncountability proof, but it also follows from the above result. To prove this, an injection will be constructed from the set T of infinite binary strings to the set R of real numbers. Since T is uncountable, the image of this function, which is a subset of R, is uncountable. Therefore, R is uncountable.

An injection from T to R  is given by mapping binary strings in T to decimal fractions, such as mapping t = 0111... to the decimal 0.0111....

Constructing a bijection between T and R is slightly more complicated.
Instead of mapping 0111... to the decimal 0.0111..., it can be mapped to the base b number: 0.0111...b. This leads to the family of functions: . This function will be modified to produce a bijection between T and R.

General sets

A generalized form of the diagonal argument was used by Cantor to prove Cantor's theorem: for every set S, the power set of S—that is, the set of all subsets of S (here written as P(S))—cannot be in bijection with S itself. This proof proceeds as follows:

Let f be any function from S to P(S).  It suffices to prove f cannot be surjective. That means that some member T of P(S), i.e. some subset of S, is not in the image of f.  As a candidate consider the set:

T = { s ∈ S: s ∉ f(s) }.

For every s in S, either s is in T or not. If s is in T, then by definition of T, s is not in f(s), so T is not equal to f(s). On the other hand,  if s is not in T, then by definition of T, s is in f(s), so again T is not equal to f(s); cf. picture.
For a more complete account of this proof, see Cantor's theorem.

Consequences

Ordering of cardinals
In the context of classical mathematics, this exhausts the possibilities and the diagonal argument can thus be used to establish that, for example, although both sets under consideration are infinite, there are actually more infinite sequences of ones and zeros than there are natural numbers. 
Cantor's result then also implies that the notion of the set of all sets is inconsistent: If S were the set of all sets, then P(S) would at the same time be bigger than S and a subset of S.

Assuming the law of excluded middle, every subcountable set (a property in terms of surjections) is also already countable. 
 
In Constructive mathematics, it is harder or impossible to order ordinals and also cardinals. For example, the Schröder–Bernstein theorem requires the law of excluded middle. Therefore, intuitionists do not accept the theorem about the cardinal ordering. The ordering on the reals (the standard ordering extending that of the rational numbers) is also not necessarily decidable. Neither are most properties of interesting classes of functions decidable, by Rice's theorem, i.e. the right set of counting numbers for the subcountable sets may not be recursive. 
In a set theory, theories of mathematics are modeled. For example, in set theory, "the" set of real numbers is identified as a set that fulfills some axioms of real numbers. Various models have been studied, such as the Dedekind reals or the Cauchy reals. Weaker axioms mean less constraints and so allow for a richer class of models. Consequently, in an otherwise constructive context (law of excluded middle not taken as axiom), it is consistent to adopt non-classical axioms that contradict consequences of the law of excluded middle. For example, the uncountable space of functions  may be asserted to be subcountable, a notion of size orthogonal to the statement . In such a context, the subcountability of all sets is possible, or injections from the uncountable  into .

Open questions
Motivated by the insight that the set of real numbers is "bigger" than the set of natural numbers, one is led to ask if there is a set whose cardinality is "between" that of the integers and that of the reals. This question leads to the famous continuum hypothesis. Similarly, the question of whether there exists a set whose cardinality is between |S| and |P(S)| for some infinite S leads to the generalized continuum hypothesis.

Diagonalization in broader context
Russell's paradox has shown that naive set theory, based on an unrestricted comprehension scheme, is contradictory.  Note that there is a similarity between the construction of T and the set in Russell's paradox. Therefore, depending on how we modify the axiom scheme of comprehension in order to avoid Russell's paradox, arguments such as the non-existence of a set of all sets may or may not remain valid.

Analogues of the diagonal argument are widely used in mathematics to prove the existence or nonexistence of certain objects. For example, the conventional proof of the unsolvability of the halting problem is essentially a diagonal argument.  Also, diagonalization was originally used to show the existence of arbitrarily hard complexity classes and played a key role in early attempts to prove P does not equal NP.

Version for Quine's New Foundations
The above proof fails for W. V. Quine's "New Foundations" set theory (NF). In NF, the naive axiom scheme of comprehension is modified to avoid the paradoxes by introducing a kind of "local" type theory.  In this axiom scheme,

{ s ∈ S: s ∉ f(s) }

is not a set — i.e., does not satisfy the axiom scheme.  On the other hand, we might try to create a modified diagonal argument by noticing that

{ s ∈ S: s ∉ f({s}) }

is a set in NF.  In which case, if P1(S) is the set of one-element subsets of S and f is a proposed bijection from P1(S) to P(S), one is able to use proof by contradiction to prove that |P1(S)| < |P(S)|.

The proof follows by the fact that if f were indeed a map onto P(S), then we could find r in S, such that  f({r}) coincides with the modified diagonal set, above.  We would conclude that if r is not in f({r}), then r is in f({r}) and vice versa.

It is not possible to put P1(S) in a one-to-one relation with S, as the two have different types, and so any function so defined would violate the typing rules for the comprehension scheme.

See also
Cantor's first uncountability proof
Controversy over Cantor's theory
Diagonal lemma

Notes

References

External links 
 Cantor's Diagonal Proof at MathPages
 

Set theory
Theorems in the foundations of mathematics
Mathematical proofs
Infinity
Arguments
Cardinal numbers
Georg Cantor